Narahari Mahato is an Indian politician from Bharatiya Janata Party. He was a member of the 15th Lok Sabha from the Purulia constituency of West Bengal and was a member of the All India Forward Bloc political party.

Education and background
Mahato has master's degree (MA) in Political science, history & Bengali. He belongs to a farmer family. After completing his education, he worked as a teacher (subsequently as Headmaster) in Srirampur High School in Joypur.

Political career 

He was a member of the 15th Lok Sabha from the Purulia elected on All India Forward Bloc political party. He joined Bharatiya Janata Party and was elected as a member of the West Bengal Legislative Assembly from  Joypur (constituency). He defeated Phanibhushan Kumar of All India Trinamool Congress by 12,102 votes in 2021 West Bengal Assembly election.

Posts held

See also

List of members of the 15th Lok Sabha of India

References

External links 

1956 births
Living people
India MPs 2004–2009
India MPs 2009–2014
Lok Sabha members from West Bengal
All India Forward Bloc politicians
University of Burdwan alumni
People from Purulia district
Ranchi University alumni
Candidates in the 2014 Indian general election
Bharatiya Janata Party politicians from West Bengal
West Bengal MLAs 2021–2026
Members of the West Bengal Legislative Assembly